Cheng Biguang (1861－26 February 1918) was a Chinese Admiral from the late Qing Dynasty and the Republic of China. He served in the Beiyang Fleet and the Republic of China Navy. When Duan Qirui refused to validate the Constitution Cheng and fellow Admiral Lin Baoyi sailed their fleets down south to join with the 'Constitutional government' of Sun Yat-sen. He was assassinated in Haizhu District, Guangzhou, in 1918.

Republic of China politicians from Guangdong
Chinese admirals
Qing dynasty admirals
1861 births
1918 deaths
Politicians from Zhongshan
Republic of China Navy admirals